Edwin James George Pitman (29 October 1897 – 21 July 1993) was an Australian mathematician who made significant contributions to statistics and probability theory. In particular, he is remembered primarily as the originator of the Pitman permutation test, Pitman nearness and Pitman efficiency.

His work the Pitman measure of closeness or Pitman nearness concerning the exponential families of probability distributions has been studied extensively since the 1980s by C. R. Rao, Pranab K. Sen, and others.

The Pitman–Koopman–Darmois theorem states that only exponential families of probability distributions admit a sufficient statistic whose dimension remains bounded as the sample size grows.

Biography
Pitman was born in Melbourne on 29 October 1897, and attended University of Melbourne, residing at Ormond College, where he graduated with First Class Honours. In 1926 he was appointed Professor of Mathematics at the University of Tasmania, which he held until his retirement in 1962.

He was a founding member and second President of the Australian Mathematical Society. He was also active within the Statistical Society of Australia, which in 1978 named the Pitman medal in his honour.

Terminology
 For "the sum of squares of deviations from the mean," he coined the term squariance.
 For "the logarithm of the likelihood" he coined the term loglihood.

However, neither of these terms caught on.

Pitman's published work (selected)

 Sufficient statistics and intrinsic accuracy, Proc. Camb. Phil. Soc. 32, (1936), 567–579.
 The "closest" estimates of statistical parameters. Proc. Camb. Phil. Soc. 33 (1937), 212–222.
 Significance tests which may be applied to samples from any populations. Suppl.J .R. Statist. Soc. 4, (1937), 119–130.
 Significance tests which may be applied to samples from any populations. II. The correlation coefficient test. Suppl. J. R. Statist. Soc. 4, (1937), 225–232.
 Significance tests which may be applied to samples from any populations. III. The analysis of variance test. Biometrika 29, (1938), 322–335.
 The estimation of the location and scale parameters of a continuous population of any given form, Biometrika 30, (1939) 391–421.
 Tests of hypotheses concerning location and scale parameters. Biometrika 31, (1939) 200–215.
 Statistics and science. Journal of the American Statistical Association 25, (1957), 322–330.
 Some remarks on statistical inference. Proc. Int. Res. Seminar, Berkeley (Bernoulli–Bayes–Laplace Anniversary Volume), (1965), 209–216. New York: Springer-Verlag.

Autobiography

Pitman contributed a chapter, "Reminiscences of a mathematician  who strayed into statistics", to the volume

Joseph M. Gani (ed.) (1982) The Making of Statisticians, New York: Springer-Verlag.

Family

He had four children, including Jim Pitman, a Professor of Statistics at UC Berkeley.

References

External links
 
 

1897 births
1993 deaths
Australian statisticians
Mathematicians from Melbourne
Fellows of the Australian Academy of Science
Academic staff of the University of Tasmania
University of Melbourne alumni
Mathematical statisticians